Vardhan Puri (born 2 May 1990) is an Indian actor who works in Hindi films. The grand son of actor Amrish Puri, he made his first screen appearance as an actor in the 2019 film Yeh Saali Aashiqui.

Early life and background
Puri is the son of Rajeev Amrish Puri and Meena Rajeev Puri. He completed his graduation from Narsee Monjee College of Commerce and Economics in 2011. 
Before making his first screen appearance as an actor in the 2019 film Yeh Saali Aashiqui, starring Shivaleeka Oberoi, Puri worked as an assistant director in Daawat-e-Ishq, Shuddh Desi Romance and Ishaqzaade.

Career
Puri's first acting role as an adult came with Yeh Saali Aashiqui, starring Shivaleeka Oberoi, directed by Cherag Ruparel, in which he played a dual role of Sahil Mehra and Surya Mehra.

Filmography

Films

References

External links 

 
 

1990 births
Puri, Vardhan
Indian male film actors
Male actors in Hindi cinema
Male actors from Mumbai